The Journal of Software: Evolution and Process is a peer-reviewed scientific journal covering all aspects of software development and evolution. It is published by John Wiley & Sons. The journal was established in 1989 as the Journal of Software Maintenance: Research and Practice, renamed in 2001 to Journal of Software Maintenance and Evolution: Research and Practice, and obtained its current title in 2012. The editors-in-chief are Massimiliano Di Penta, Darren Dalcher, Xin Peng, and David Raffo.

Abstracting and indexing 
The journal is abstracted and indexed in:

According to the Journal Citation Reports, the journal has a 2020 impact factor of 1.972, ranking it 55th out of 108 journals in the category "Computer Science, Software Engineering".

References

External links 
 

Computer science journals
Software engineering publications
Software maintenance
Publications established in 1989
Wiley (publisher) academic journals
Monthly journals
English-language journals